This article ranks the tallest buildings on the African continent by height. Initially, only a small number of major financial and commercial centers boasted large skylines, such as Cairo, Johannesburg, Lagos and Nairobi. However, since the 2000s, skyscrapers have been constructed in many other African cities, including Durban, Cape Town, Maputo, Abuja, Addis Ababa, Dar es Salaam, Alexandria, Harare, Abidjan, Luanda and Port Louis.

The tallest skyscraper currently under construction in Africa is the F Tower in Abidjan, Côte d'Ivoire, which will reach  in height - work by PFO Africa and BESIX started in 2021.

Tallest buildings
This includes spires and architectural details, but does not include antenna masts and minarets.

Timeline of tallest skyscrapers in Africa

Tallest under construction, approved or proposed

Under construction

On-hold, approved or proposed 

See also

 List of tallest buildings in Algeria
 List of tallest buildings in Egypt
 List of tallest buildings in Kenya
 List of tallest buildings in Morocco
 List of tallest buildings in Nigeria
 List of tallest buildings in Tanzania
 List of tallest buildings in Zimbabwe
 List of tallest buildings in South Africa
 List of tallest buildings in Abidjan
 List of tallest buildings in Cairo
 List of tallest buildings in Cape Town
 List of tallest buildings in Kampala
 List of tallest buildings in Luanda

References